The Autódromo Municipal Juan Manuel Fangio is a motor sports racing circuit located in Rosario in the Santa Fe Province of Argentina.

It has hosted national touring car races such as the Turismo Carretera, TC2000 and Top Race V6, as well as the World RX of Argentina in 2015 and 2016.

Events

 Current

 April: TCR South America Touring Car Championship

 Former
 FIA World Rallycross Championship World RX of Argentina (2015–2016)
 South American Super Touring Car Championship (1997–2000)
 TC2000 Championship (1993–1996, 2012–2019, 2021–2022)
 Top Race V6 (1997, 2001–2002, 2004, 2012–2017, 2022)
 Turismo Carretera (2019)
 Turismo Nacional (1993–1996, 2017–2019, 2021–2022)

Lap records 

The official fastest race lap records at the Autódromo Municipal Juan Manuel Fangio are listed as:

References 

Sport in Santa Fe Province
Sports venues completed in 1982
Motorsport venues in Santa Fe Province
World Rallycross circuits